This article features the 1988 UEFA European Under-18 Championship qualifying stage. Matches were played 1986 through 1988. Eight group winners qualified for the main tournament in Czechoslovakia.

Group 1

Group 2

Group 3

Group 4

Group 5

Group 6

Group 7

Group 8

See also
 1988 UEFA European Under-18 Championship

External links
Results by RSSSF

UEFA European Under-19 Championship qualification
Qual
Qual